RecargaPay is a Brazilian fintech focused on online money services. It provides an ecosystem of payments for customers via a proprietary application (App). It was founded in 2010 by Rodrigo Teijeiro (CEO), Alvaro Teijeiro (CTO), and Gustavo Victorica (COO); the company has over 300 employees based mainly in São Paulo, Buenos Aires, Argentina, and Miami, USA. 

Since its inception, it has already registered a total of more than 30 million downloads in app stores, and its solutions are among the top-ranked financial service apps in Google Play and the App Store. In the last round of investment funding, it closed a deal with Series C injection of more than $70 million.

History
The company was founded in 2010 by the brothers Rodrigo and Álvaro Teijeiro, current CEO and CTO, respectively, and Gustavo Victorica, current COO.

Recarga.com operated in Latin America and in the United States under the ownership of Fnbox, a technology company organized as a holding company that used to manage several online services. By August 2012, the company had processed transactions in six countries for 110,000 customers across more than twenty mobile carriers.

In 2013, Fnbox began a process of dismemberment to focus exclusively on the mobile recharge business. Consequently, Recarga.com became RecargaPay, and diversified its product offering. According to Rodrigo Teijeiro, the company is "a complete ecosystem of mobile financial services." In an interview with InfoMoney in mid-2021, the company's founder stated: "We want users to solve their essential payments, the kinds that are made every month, from the couch. We are empowering consumers and small businesses through democratization and scalability of financial services."

In February 2018, it was reported that RecargaPay had raised $63 million in venture capital from a group of investors led by member companies of World Bank Group (WBG) plus TheVentureCity, DN Capital, Fabrice Grinda, Martin Varsavsky, and many more investors who used the Angellist medium as a form of support.

Since its founding, several services and products have been added to RecargaPay, making up what is now considered the largest mobile payments and digital financial services ecosystem in Brazil. In September 2018 RecargaPay launched its first physical product: a prepaid card.

On April 20, 2020, Rodrigo Teijeiro announced the marketing director Renato Camargo as the National Manager of RecargaPay in Brazil. The company is creating a mobile money ecosystem where the customers can interact with or without a bank, providing consumers and businesses with a one-stop-shop for all their financial needs.

Services

Users can choose to pay by credit card, debit card, by redeeming Livelo points or PIX, or with the money from the RecargaPay wallet, which does not require a bank account and can be charged by boleto, deposit or bank transfer. There are no extra charges for payments up to five hundred reais in the free plan or for up to two thousand reais a month in the Prime+ plan.

RecargaPay's services can also be resold, a practice adopted by several merchants who use cell phone recharge and bill payment as a way to attract customers to their establishments and earn discounts on the services offered by the fintech.

Cell phone recharges
It allows recharging cell phone subscriptions from several carriers, including Claro, TIM, Vivo, Oi, Correios, Sercomtel, Algar, and Surf Telecom. It is also possible to schedule cell phone recharges with the Automatic Recharge function or even do an Offline Recharge if the person is out of credits.

Transport card recharge
Transportation cards from various cities can be refilled. They are: Bilhete Único (São Paulo, São José dos Campos and São Luís), SOU (Diadema), NOSSO (Ribeirão Preto), PraTi (Pelotas), VEM (Recife), Com Você (Sorocaba), Cartão Rápido (Taubaté), Bem Legal (Maceió), Cartão URBS (Curitiba), Cartão GV (Vitória), Peg Fácil (Campo Grande), Cartão Integração (Salvador), SETAP (Macapá), Cartão Legal (São Bernardo do Campo), CriciúmaCard (Criciúma) and Cartão TRI (Porto Alegre). The service is free and offers cashback on the first recharge of up to twenty reais, as well as the option to set an Automatic Recharge.

Bills payment
Consumer bills such as water, electricity, internet, telephone, gas, government taxes, and boletos can be paid via RecargaPay.

Gift cards and other services
Android users can buy credits for Google Play, Uber prepaid, Uber Eats, Spotify, Free Fire, PlayStation, Steam, Xbox, Xbox Live, League of Legends, Blizzard, Level Up, McDonald's, iFood, and Netshoes. iOS users can buy credits for prepaid Uber, Uber Eats, McDonald's, and iFood. Also available for Android and iOS are the digital Tele Sena, Prepaid TV, and Gas Voucher.

Post-paid
Post-paid can be used if an error occurs with the credit card payment, or if the user has no money available in the wallet. The system will suggest completing the purchase through the Post-paid service. This adds a fee that must be paid within a deadline.

Send money
Users can transfer money from one RecargaPay account to another RecargaPay account with just the recipient's mobile number, or via PIX, with no paperwork or fees.

Prime+
Prime+ is an exclusive subscription that offers benefits to customers for 19,99 reais per month, such as special discounts and cashback in many services. Prime+ also gives one percent of cashback in any purchase paid by the physical prepaid card, despite the possibility to pay bills up to two thousand reais without extras fees.

Accolades
In 2016, RecargaPay was nominated in two categories of the Latam Founders Awards: Most Innovative Company and Best B2C Company, losing in both nominations for Pipefy and Nubank, respectively. At the ReclameAqui Awards, RecargaPay received honors for four consecutive years: it achieved third place for Online Payments two times, the second place for Financial Solutions and the fifth place for Digital Payment Method.

References

External links 
 Official website

Technology companies established in 2010
IOS software
Android (operating system) software
Online companies of Brazil
Service companies of Brazil
Privately held companies of Brazil
Companies based in São Paulo
E-commerce in Brazil
Online payments